Sonia Dresdel (5 May 1909 – 18 January 1976) was an English actress, whose career ran between the 1940s and 1970s.

Life
She was born Lois Obee in Hornsea, East Riding of Yorkshire, England, and was educated at Aberdeen High School for Girls and RADA.

Career
Her performance in the lead role of Ibsen's Hedda Gabler at the Westminster Theatre in 1942 "was legendary. It was the performance on which her reputation was founded. James Agate was ecstatic..." For a decade Dresdel was regarded as one of England's foremost stage actresses.  Her leading role in the 1947 film While I Live also gained her a great deal of acclaim. In the film she plays Julia Trevelyan, a spinster living in a lonely cliff top house in Cornwall and haunted by the death of her sister 25 years earlier.

Her best remembered role is as Mrs. Baines in the film version of Graham Greene's The Fallen Idol (1948), which starred Ralph Richardson, Michèle Morgan and Bobby Henrey. The film received Academy Awards nominations for Best Director (Sir Carol Reed) and Best Screenplay.

In the 1950s, as well as appearing increasingly on television, Dresdel moved more to the management side of things, becoming a theatre director under the aegis of the New White Rose Players, directing plays including the thriller Night of the Shoot.

In the 1970s she played the Witch in BBC Television series "Lizzie Dripping", and played Lady Dorothy in the series “Sykes” series 2 episode 5 “Rolls”.

Death
She died of lung cancer, aged 66. The critic Philip Hope-Wallace, said Dresdel was "an actress of high definition with a real power to take an audience by the wrist and give them the works. She had terrific personality and was terribly underused and misused. She would have been the Lady Macbeth of all Lady Macbeths."

Partial filmography

 The World Owes Me a Living (1945) as Eve Heatherley
 While I Live (1947) as Julia Trevelyan
 This Was a Woman (1948) as Sylvia Russell
 The Fallen Idol (1948) as Mrs. Baines
 The Clouded Yellow (1951) as Jess Fenton
 The Third Visitor (1951) as Steffy Millington
 Now and Forever (1956) as Miss Fox
 The Secret Tent (1956) as Miss Mitchum-Browne
David Copperfield (1956) as Betsey Trotwood
 Death Over My Shoulder (1958) as Miss Upton
 The Trials of Oscar Wilde (1960) as Lady Wilde
 George and the Dragon (1967–1968, TV Series) as Priscilla
 The Break (1962) as Sarah
 Jane Eyre (1963, TV series) as Mrs. Reed
 Public Eye (1968, TV Series) as Mrs. Briggs
 Dixon of Dock Green (1968) as Mrs. Dewar
 The Caesars (1968) as Livia
 Last of the Long-haired Boys (1968) as Miss Dearborn
 Bachelor Father (1970–1971, TV Series) as Mother
 Paul Temple (1971, TV Series) as Agnes Armadyne
 Wives and Daughters (1971, TV Mini-Series) as Lady Cumnor
 The Strauss Family (1972, TV Mini-Series) as Lucari
 Lady Caroline Lamb (1972) as Lady Pont
 The Onedin Line (1972, TV Series) as Lady Lazenby
 Lizzie Dripping (1973-1975, TV Series) as The Witch
 The Pallisers (1974, TV Mini-Series) as the Marchioness of Auld Reekie

References

External links

1909 births
1976 deaths
British film actresses
People from Hornsea
People educated at Harlaw Academy
British stage actresses
Actresses from Yorkshire
20th-century British actresses
20th-century English women
20th-century English people